Barot is an Indian caste native to Gujarat and Rajasthan. They traditionally worked as historians, genealogists and mythographers.

Origin 
The caste is also known as "Vahivancha Barots". The word Vahivancha (IAST: "Vahīvancā) literally means "one who reads a vahi" (vahi means a book of genealogy, a ledger or a book in general). The Vahivanchas traditionally maintained genealogies, told stories and recited bardic poetry. The term "Barot" was originally used as an honorific title for both Vahivanchas and Bhat, and was gradually adopted as a caste appellation by the Vahivanchas.

According to one theory, the caste of Vahivancha Barots developed from the Bhats. Widespread tradition states that the Vahivanchas came to Gujarat from Rajputana during the Solanki period (942-1245 CE). The oldest extant Vahivancha book dates back to 1740 CE, written in Old Gujarati language. They are said to be of Brahmin origin.

Present circumstances 
At present, the traditional occupation of Barots or Bhatts is on the verge of extinction as the new generation of the casts/communities for whom they worked as Barots, no longer patronise them. Further, the young generation of Barots, also have got involved in other occupation and businesses and higher studies.

See also 
Bhats
Rai Bhat

References 

Social groups of Gujarat
Indian surnames
Social groups of Rajasthan
Scheduled Castes of Gujarat